Miguel Núñez is a Spanish footballer.

Miguel Núñez my also refer to:

Miguel Núñez (athlete)
Miguel A. Núñez, Jr.
Miguel Núñez (theologian)